Trap Them was an American hardcore punk band formed in Salem, New Hampshire in 2001. They released five studio albums and five EPs, including a split EP with Extreme Noise Terror.

History 
Trap Them began in 2001 as a side-project for Ryan McKenney, who at the time was the vocalist of Backstabbers Incorporated and Brian Izzi, a brief second guitarist Backstabbers Incorporated, and consistent member of December Wolves. The pair first met as employees of Newbury Comics in Salem, New Hampshire. They took the band's name from the 1977 film by Joe D'Amato called Trap Them And Kill Them, known also as Emanuelle E Gli Ultimi Cannibali and Emanuelle and the Last Cannibals. In this early time they created a self released MCD under the moniker of Trap Them and Kill Them. Both departed from Backstabbers Incorporated in 2008 and soon became roommates, leading to Trap Them becoming their full-time project.

On April 3, 2007, they released their debut album Sleepwell Deconstructor. They toured Europe in early 2008 with the Ocean and Rotten Sound.

Trap Them worked with crust punk band Extreme Noise Terror for a split EP and toured the U.S. with Napalm Death. Their second album Seizures in Barren Praise, was released in November 2008. In May 2009, the band played on the year's bill for the annual Maryland Deathfest music festival in Baltimore, Maryland. The band went on US tours with Victims and Black Breath in May and June 2009, and Skeletonwitch and Saviours in mid-July.

In 2010 the band released the EP Filth Rations, initially only as a strictly limited cassette release restricted to just fifty copies available at their appearance at the Scion Rock Festival. The EP was later released on Southern Lord Records on 12" vinyl featuring an etching on the B-side by artist Justin Bartlett, who also drew the main cover.

In late 2010, it was announced that in March 2011 the band would release their third full-length Darker Handcraft through Prosthetic Records - their first for the label since signing for them in mid-2009.
In April 2011, the band embarked on a European tour to promote the album as main support for Rotten Sound.

On April 7, 2014, the band announced that they had completed work on their following album, titled Blissfucker, which was released on June 10, 2014. It was the first album to feature their new bassist, Galen Baudhuin (Infera Bruo), and drummer Brad Fickeisen (No Salvation, ex-The Red Chord).

Crown Feral, the band's fifth and final studio album, was released on September 23, 2016, via Prosthetic Records. The album was again recorded with producer Kurt Ballou at the God City recording studio and featured artwork from artist Mattias Frisk.

The band performed their final three shows in November in New York City, Montreal and Boston before disbanding.

Musical style and influences 
Trap Them's music has been categorised as grindcore, crust punk, hardcore punk and metalcore. The band make heavy use of the Boss HM-2 guitar pedal, which creates a distinctive guitar tone that was first popularised by Swedish death metal bands. Metal Injection writer Christopher described their sound as Luedtke "Bringing a hardcore/punk, d-beat, and grind attitude with death metal riffs ala Grave".

The band's influences include hardcore and crust punk bands, such as Black Flag, Born Against, and Tragedy and metal bands like Dismember and Entombed.

Members
Final
Brian Izzi - guitar (2001-2017)
Ryan McKenney - vocals (2001-2017)
Brad Fickeisen - drums (2013-2017)
Galen Baudhuin - bass (2013-2017)

Past
Nat Coghlan - bass (2006-2007)
Scott DeFusco - drums (2006-2007)
Mike Sharp - drums (2007-2008)
Derek Black - bass (2007)
Stephen LaCour - bass (2007-2011)
Mike Justian - drums (2008-2009)
Chris Maggio - drums (2009-2013)

Timeline

Discography

Studio albums
 Sleepwell Deconstructor (2007, Trash Art!)
 Seizures in Barren Praise (2008, Deathwish)
 Darker Handcraft (2011, Prosthetic)
 Blissfucker (2014, Prosthetic)
 Crown Feral (2016, Prosthetic)

EPs and splits
 77K7 (2002, self-released)
 Cunt Heir to the Throne (2007, Trash Art!)
 Séance Prime (2007, Deathwish)
 Extreme Noise Terror / Trap Them (split with Extreme Noise Terror) (2008, Deathwish)
 Filth Rations (2010, Southern Lord)

Compilation contributions
 People Don't Take Pictures of Things They Want to Forget'' (2003)

References

External links
 Trap Them artist page at Prosthetic Records
 Trap Them at Deathwish Inc.
 Ryan McKenney interviewed on The Bone Reader

American grindcore musical groups
American crust and d-beat groups
Hardcore punk groups from Washington (state)
Musical groups established in 2001
Musical groups disestablished in 2017
Deathwish Inc. artists